Immaculate Conception Parish - Roman Catholic parish, designated for Polish immigrants in Indian Orchard, Massachusetts, United States.

Founded 1904. It is one of the Polish-American Roman Catholic parishes in New England in the Diocese of Springfield in Massachusetts.

Parish scheduled to close in 2009 but parish given an extension by the Bishop of Springfield to June 2010.
The parish is seeking to become an Historical District to protect all the buildings.  On September 18, 2010, it was announced that the bishop had accepted the parish's long-term plan and reconsidered his decision.  Immaculate Conception will remain open.

Bibliography 
 
 The Official Catholic Directory in USA

External links 
 Immaculate Conception - Diocesan Information
 Immaculate Conception - ParishesOnline.com
 Diocese of Springfield in Massachusetts
 Pastoral planning in Diocese of Springfield in Massachusetts
 Members of Immaculate Conception Church in Springfield's Indian Orchard vow to fight to keep parish alive

Roman Catholic parishes of Diocese of Springfield in Massachusetts
Polish-American Roman Catholic parishes in Massachusetts
1904 establishments in Massachusetts
Christian organizations established in 1904